Didiom was a digital media company that specialized in the development of streaming media applications and wireless content delivery platforms. Built on peer-to-peer placeshifting technology, the company's flagship product allowed customers to stream their home computer's audio collection to their phone wirelessly, eliminating the need for data cables and memory cards. With two million songs under its management, Didiom previously launched an on-device music store that allowed customers to name their own prices for music downloads. In February 2011, Didiom was acquired by SnapOne, Inc. (formerly Exclaim Mobility, Inc.)

History

Didiom, an acronym for “Digital Distribution of Music”, was founded by Ran Assaf in 2005. The company has developed a cloud-based content delivery platform and launched a music download service in 2007. The independent service allowed users to shop for full-track music downloads directly from their phone, and share music with friends wirelessly. The service's most unusual feature enabled users to name their own price for songs and albums, which leveraged Didiom's adaptive bargaining algorithm that set retail prices dynamically.

In October 2008, Didiom launched a public beta test of a hybrid mobile service, that enabled BlackBerry and Windows phone owners to stream their iTunes library directly from their home computer to their phone wirelessly, for free, and also to buy music from Didiom's on-device MP3 store. The majority of the music catalog that the company offered came from CD Baby, Finetunes, and Phonofile.

In February 2010, the company concluded its beta test, shut down its MP3 store, and launched Didiom Pro, a freemium placeshifting service, using a subscription business model. Didiom Pro has offered a new set of mobile and desktop applications that allowed users to stream audio files from their computer to their iPhone, iPod Touch, BlackBerry, or Windows phone. The new service also enabled users to download their favorite music, podcasts and audiobooks to their mobile device wirelessly for offline listening, stream Windows Media DRM-protected content on demand and shuffle their audio collection over 3G or Wi-Fi.  Prior to being acquired by Princeton-based Exclaim Mobility (now SnapOne, Inc.) in early 2011, Didiom's mobile applications were available for download from the App Store (iOS), BlackBerry App World, Windows Marketplace for Mobile, Verizon’s VCast App Store, and Samsung Apps.

Technology

Didiom has been developing a software-based peer-to-peer placeshifting technology since 2007. The major advantage of peer-to-peer placeshifting is that end-users share the burden of providing computing resources, such as processing power, disk storage or network bandwidth. With cloud-based functionality and authentication system, Didiom maintained an encrypted channel between a personal computer and phone over 3G and Wi-Fi, and eliminated the need to upload a media collection to its servers.  Regardless of the desktop media player, or the amount of storage capacity on a mobile phone, Didiom scanned a computer, and made the media collection available for wireless streaming and downloading to mobile phones. All streams were SSL encrypted for high-value transmissions, such as online banking transactions.

Didiom's technology supported audio files in the format of DRM-free and DRM-protected Windows Media Audio (WMA), MP3, WAV, Advanced Audio Coding (AAC), M4A and Ogg Vorbis, as well as iTunes playlists, and playlists in Windows Media Player Playlist (WPL), PLS and M3U formats. It did not support DRM-protected AAC files (M4P) purchased via the iTunes Store and audiobooks in AA format purchased via Audible.com.

Awards

Didiom has received multiple awards for its products, including recognition from The One Club and the International Academy of the Visual Arts. Red Herring magazine named it one of North America's top 200 private technology companies, and one of the world's top 200 private technology companies in 2010.

See also

 Placeshifting
 Streaming media
 Orb Networks

References

Defunct technology companies of the United States
Technology companies established in 2005
Technology companies disestablished in 2005
2011 mergers and acquisitions